The Nova Scotia Provincial Housing Agency (NSPHA) is a Crown corporation responsible for administering public housing in the Canadian province of Nova Scotia. It was formed in 2022 through a merger of five regional housing authorities.

History
In 2022, the Nova Scotia Affordable Housing Commission (appointed in 2020) released its final progress report. The commission made several recommendations, including the modernisation of provincial housing legislation and the establishment of a "arm’s length independent provincial housing entity". The same year, Nova Scotia's auditor general released a report critical of the management of public housing in the province.

The Nova Scotia Provincial Housing Agency was established by the Housing Supply and Services Act, which replaced the Housing Act and Housing Nova Scotia Act in late 2022. Under the new legislation, NSPHA was formed by merging Nova Scotia's five regional housing authorities:

 Cape Breton Island Regional Housing Authority
 Cobequid Housing Authority
 Eastern Mainland Housing Authority
 Metro Regional Housing Authority
 Western Regional Housing Authority

The housing authority boards were also dissolved. The NSPHA has an advisory board that answers to Nova Scotia's minister of housing. At the time of its establishment, the NSPHA was responsible for around 11,200 housing units.

Administrative structure
The NSPHA is headquartered in Halifax and has four regional offices:

 Cape Breton Island District – Cape Breton Island
 Metropolitan District – Halifax region
 Northern District – Guysborough County, Antigonish County, Pictou County, Cumberland County, Colchester County
 Western District – Kings County, Annapolis County, Digby County, Yarmouth County, Shelburne County, Queens County, Lunenburg County and Hants County (East and West)

References

External links
 

2022 establishments in Nova Scotia
Crown corporations of Nova Scotia
Government agencies established in 2022
Public housing in Canada